The List of Ottoman postal rates in Palestine surveys the postal rates in effect between 1840–1918 during the Ottoman rule in Palestine. Rates not applicable in Palestine are not included.

The Imperial edict of 12 Ramasan 1256 (14 October 1840) and later ordinances made the distinction between three types of mail items: ordinary letters, registered letters (markings te'ahudd olunmoshdur), and official letters (markings tahirat-i mühümme). Prior to the Imperial Edict, the Ottoman postal service was intermittent for the inland cities in Palestine. Fees were calculated by the type of mail, the weight, and the distance (measured in hours): in 1840, an ordinary letter, weighing less than 10g, had a cost per hour of 1 para. Special fees applied to samples, insured mail, special delivery, and printed matters, etc. The postal rates changed frequently, and new services were added over the years. Upon joining the Universal Postal Union on 1 July 1875, Ottoman overseas rates conformed to UPU rules.

Postal rates

Currency:
 1 Lira (Pound) = 100 kuruş
 1 kuruş = 40 para

See also
Ottoman post offices in Palestine
Postage stamps and postal history of Palestine

References and sources
Notes

Sources
 Collins, Norman J. and Anton Steichele (2000). The Ottoman post and telegraph offices in Palestine and Sinai. London: Sahara. .
 Steichele, Anton (1990/1991). The foreign post offices in Palestine : 1840–1918. 2 vols. Chicago: World Philatelic Congress of Israel, Holy Land, and Judaica Societies.

Palestine (region)-related lists
Palestine
Philately of Turkey
Palestine Ottoman
Communications in the Ottoman Empire
Postal rates in Palestine